Redirects to Wiktionary